Zafarabad may refer to:
 Zafarabad, India
 Zafarabad, alternate name of Jafarabad, Borujerd, in Iran
 Zafarabad, alternate name of Javadabad, Delfan, in Iran
 Zafarabad, Fars, a village in Fars Province, Iran
 Zafarabad, Hamadan, a village in Hamadan Province, Iran
 Zafarabad, alternate name of Khvajeh Hoseyni, Hamadan Province, Iran
 Zafarabad, Kohgiluyeh and Boyer-Ahmad
 Zafarabad, Dehgolan, Kurdistan Province, Iran
 Zafarabad, Divandarreh, Kurdistan Province, Iran
 Zafarabad, Delfan, a village in Lorestan Province, Iran
 Zafarabad, Kakavand, a village in Lorestan Province, Iran
 Zafarabad, North Khorasan, a village in North Khorasan Province, Iran